Hellenic Train S.A. maintains, repairs, manages and operates a variety of railway rolling stock, which belongs to the Greek State (GAIAOSE SA), except the Hellenic Train's ETR 470. The origin of these trains is mainly German, Greek assembly.

Active rolling stock of Hellenic Train

Locomotives (5 diesel, 1 electric)

Note: Includes withdrawn types (QTY indicates the number of delivered units)

Diesel shunters (under withdrawal)

Diesel trainsets

Electric trainsets

See also
 GAIAOSE
 Hellenic Railways Organisation
 Hellenic Train
 Railways of Greece

References
8.  ose.gr/images/150/ALCO201.pdf

9.  mixanikosose.blogspot.com/2019/09/blog-post_20.html

Further reading

  It is the only extensive and authoritative source for the history of Greek railways until 1997.
  Contains brief history, simple line maps and extensive list of rolling stock until 1997.
 
 
 
 

!